In mathematics, an ovoid O of a (finite) polar space of rank r is a set of points, such that every subspace of rank  intersects O in exactly one point.

Cases

Symplectic polar space

However it only has an ovoid if and only  and q is even.  In that case, when the polar space is embedded into  the classical way, it is also an ovoid in the projective geometry sense.

Hermitian polar space

Hyperbolic quadrics

An ovoid of a hyperbolic quadricwould contain  points.

Parabolic quadrics

An ovoid of a parabolic quadric  would contain  points.  For , it is easy to see to obtain an ovoid by cutting the parabolic quadric with a hyperplane, such that the intersection is an elliptic quadric.  The intersection is an ovoid.  

Elliptic quadrics

An ovoid of an elliptic quadric would contain  points.

See also

 Ovoid (projective geometry)

References

Incidence geometry